Saddler v. the Republic, Dallam 610 (1844), was a case decided by the Supreme Court of the Republic of Texas which held that although more than one person must take part in an affray, at trial, one may still be convicted even if the others charged are acquitted.

Background 
In the fall of 1843, the grand jury of Lamar County, Texas indicted Hiram Saddler, Thomas Doss, Joshua Dillingham and C. W. Saddler for an affray.  Before trial, the prosecutor dropped charges against Dillingham, and the case went to trial against the other defendants.  The jury found Hiram Saddler guilty, but acquitted the other two.  Hiram Saddler appealed.

Decision 
Judge William B. Ochiltree issued the opinion of the Court.  He noted that Hiram Saddler claimed that he could not be convicted if the others indicted with him were acquitted, and that it took more than one individual to create an affray, that they had to fight by consent.  Ochiltree dismissed this contention, noting that fighting by consent was not part of the offense, but fight in public was, although not all parties need consent to the fight to be involved.  Even if the others were acquitted, the conviction against Hiram Saddler was affirmed.

References 

Republic of Texas law
1844 in case law
1844 in the Republic of Texas